The legislative districts of Cavite are the representations of the province of Cavite in the various national and local legislatures of the Philippines. At present, the province is represented in the House of Representatives of the Philippines by its eight congressional districts, with the districts' representatives being elected every three years. The congressional districts are coextensive with the provincial board districts, where each district is allotted two seats in the Cavite Provincial Board, creating a total of sixteen elective seats in the legislature.

History 
Cavite initially comprised a single district in 1898, when it elected four representatives to the Malolos Congress that lasted until 1899. The district was recreated in 1907 for the Philippine Assembly, this time electing one representative at-large. When seats for the upper house of the Philippine Legislature were elected from territory-based districts between 1916 and 1935, the province formed part of the fifth senatorial district which elected two out of the 24-member senate.

In the disruption caused by the Second World War, two delegates represented the province in the National Assembly of the Japanese-sponsored Second Philippine Republic: one was the provincial governor (an ex officio member), while the other was elected through a provincial assembly of KALIBAPI members during the Japanese occupation of the Philippines. Cavite City, being a chartered city, was represented separately in this short-lived legislative body. Tagaytay, the province's other chartered city, was placed under provincial jurisdiction during the war and was not represented separately. Upon the restoration of the Philippine Commonwealth in 1945, the province and its two cities reverted to the pre-war lone district representation.

The province was represented in the Interim Batasang Pambansa as part of Region IV-A from 1978 to 1984, and returned three representatives, elected at large, to the Regular Batasang Pambansa in 1984. Cavite was reapportioned into three congressional districts under the new Constitution which was proclaimed on February 11, 1987, and elected members to the restored House of Representatives starting that same year.

The passage of Republic Act No. 9727 on October 22, 2009, increased the number of the province's representatives from three to seven, starting in the 2010 elections. However, the conversion of Dasmariñas into a city has resulted in an additional legal name for the fourth district, which became the Lone District of Dasmariñas after the ratification of Republic Act No. 9723 on November 25, 2009.

Meanwhile, despite the conversion of Bacoor and Imus into cities in 2012, their charters explicitly indicate the retention of their numerical designations as the second and third districts of the province.

Republic Act No. 11069, signed into law on September 17, 2018, reapportioned Cavite into eight legislative districts — the most for any province — by creating a separate legislative district for the newly converted city of General Trias. This effectively supersedes RA No. 9723 and confirms the sole legal designation of the congressional district of Dasmariñas as the fourth district of Cavite.

Current congressional districts 
The province's current congressional delegation composes of five members of the National Unity Party, two members of Lakas-CMD, and one member of the Nationalist People's Coalition.

Historical districts

Lone congressional district (1898–1986)

See also 
Legislative district of Cavite City
Legislative district of Dasmariñas

References 

Cavite
Politics of Cavite